The 6th New Brunswick Legislative Assembly represented New Brunswick between February 4, 1817, and 1819.

The assembly sat at the pleasure of colonial administrator Harris William Hailes. George Stracey Smyth became Governor of New Brunswick in July 1817.

The speaker of the house was selected as William Botsford.

History

Members 

Notes:

References 
Journal of the House of Assembly of the province of New-Brunswick from ... February to ... March, 1817 (1817)

06
1817 in Canada
1818 in Canada
1819 in Canada
1817 establishments in New Brunswick
1819 disestablishments in New Brunswick